Detention is a Taiwanese supernatural horror drama streaming television show, created for Netflix in collaboration with Public Television Service, based on the video game of the same name developed by Red Candle Games. It premiered on 5 December 2020.

Plot
Based on the game set in the period of martial law known as the White Terror in Taiwan, Detention entwines the suffocating political situations under martial law and heart-stopping legends of local deities, portraying a labyrinth of unspeakable oppressions.

The series opens at Greenwood High School in 1999. Transfer student Yunxiang Liu (Lingwei Lee) enters a forbidden area of the school grounds, where she encounters the ghost of Ray-Xin Fang (Ning Han). Fang reveals the hidden history of the school over the past 30 years, including how a group of students and teachers were persecuted as they fought for freedom in the era of censorship.

Cast
Ling-Wei Lee (李玲葦) as Yunxiang Liu
Ning Han (韓寧) as Ray-Xin Fang
Guang-Zhi Huan (黃冠志) as  Wen-Liang Cheng
Yao Chun-yao
David Chao

Episodes

Release
The eight-episode series premiered on 5 December 2020, 21:00 National Standard Time, with one new episode being released each Saturday. The series is an addition to Netflix's Chinese Language Originals collection.

References

External links

2020 Taiwanese television series debuts
2020 Taiwanese television series endings
Mandarin-language Netflix original programming
Ghosts in television
Horror drama television series
Murder in television
Public Television Service original programming
Suicide in television
Television series set in 1969
Television series set in 1999
Television series set in 2000
Detention (video game)
Rape in television
Live action television shows based on video games